is a Japanese politician born on January 8, 1958. He is a former member of the House of Representatives and was the inaugural Secretary-General of the Party for Future Generations, an opposition party formed in August 2014.

A graduate of Kyoto University (with a major in law), In April 2010 Yamada became chairman of the Spirit of Japan Party, which he founded for the Upper House election, with Hiroshi Nakada, the former mayor of Yokohama, and Hiroshi Saitō, the former governor of Yamagata. The party won a few seats at the prefectural and municipal level in the regional elections in 2011, and broke up in the fall of 2012 to join the Japan Restoration Party of the former governor of Tokyo Shintaro Ishihara, and later joined his Party for Future Generations. He lost his seat in the Diet in the December 2014 general election. In September 2015 it was announced that he would contest the 2016 House of Councillors election as a member of the Liberal Democratic Party.

Like Ishihara, Yamada is affiliated to the openly revisionist lobby Nippon Kaigi. He often gives lectures to local branches of the organization.

References

Party for Japanese Kokoro politicians
21st-century Japanese politicians
Living people
1958 births
Members of Nippon Kaigi
Members of the House of Representatives (Japan)
Kyoto University alumni
Fellows of the American Physical Society